Hilde Zach (August 25, 1942 – January 15, 2011) was the mayor of Innsbruck, Austria. She was elected in 2002 by the city council, becoming the city's first woman mayor. She resigned due to poor health in February 2010. Zach came from a business background, having run a business that had previously been run by her parents.

Awards
2005: Cross of the Order pro merito Melitensi of the Sovereign Military Order of Malta 
2005: Grand Decoration of Honour in Gold for Services to Republic of Austria (Großes goldenes Ehrenzeichen für Verdienste um die Republik Österreich) 
2010: Honorary citizen of Innsbruck (Ehrenbürgerin der Stadt Innsbruck)
2011: Knight's Cross of the Order of Merit of the Republic of Poland (posthumously)

References

1942 births
2011 deaths
Congress of the Council of Europe
Women mayors of places in Austria
Austrian women in politics
Mayors of places in Austria
Politicians from Innsbruck
Recipients of the Order of Merit of the Republic of Poland
Recipients of the Grand Decoration for Services to the Republic of Austria
Recipients of the Order pro Merito Melitensi
21st-century Austrian women politicians
21st-century Austrian politicians